Foofwa d’Imobilité (born 24 March 1969) is a Swiss dancer and choreographer. He lives and works in Geneva, Switzerland, and Brooklyn, New York.

Life and career
Foofwa d’Imobilité was born Frédéric Gafner in Geneva, Switzerland. His mother was Beatriz Consuelo, a Brazilian ballerina/dance teacher, and his father was Claude Gafner, a Swiss dancer and photographer. Gafner studied at the Ecole de Danse de Geneva and performed as a member of the Geneva Ballet Junior. From 1987-1990, he worked as a dancer and soloist with the Stuttgart Ballet. From 1991-1998, he was a dancer with the Merce Cunningham Dance Company.

Gafner changed his name in the mid-1990s to Foofwa d’Imobilité. In 1998 he began working as a choreographer, and in 2000 founded Neopost Ahrrrt, where he serves as Artistic Director.

Honors and awards

2009 Foundation for Contemporary Arts Grants to Artists Award
2006 Swiss Prize of Dance and Choreography
1999 Grantee, Fondation Leenaards, Switzerland
1995 New York Dance and Performance Award for Exceptional Artistry in the work of Merce Cunningham
1987 Prix Professionnel at the Prix de Lausanne, Switzerland
1986 Bronze Medal, International Dance Competition, Jackson, Mississippi

Works

Selected works include:
2010 Au Contraire
2008 The Making of Spectacles
2006 Incidences
2005 Benjamin de Bouillis
2003 Kilometrix.dancerun.4
2003 Match.dancerun.6
2001 Le Show
1999 Terpsicorp
1998 Iuj Godog?

References

External links
Official web site
Foofwa d'Imobilité and Gérald Zbinden at Fri-Art
 

1969 births
Living people
Modern dancers
Contemporary dance choreographers
Swiss male dancers
Dance in New York City
Bessie Award winners